Jacek Ratajczak (born 10 July 1973) is a Polish former professional footballer who played as a forward.

References

External links
 

1973 births
Living people
People from Wałcz County
Polish footballers
Association football forwards
Flota Świnoujście players
Pogoń Szczecin players
VfL Bochum II players
SV Babelsberg 03 players
Widzew Łódź players
Sportspeople from West Pomeranian Voivodeship